Fisherman Island is an island in Lake Michigan on the western shore of Charlevoix County, Michigan.  The island part of the 2,678-acre Fisherman's Island State Park. The island becomes a peninsula with the mainland, when water levels are low in Lake Michigan.

Climate

References 

Islands of Lake Michigan in Michigan
Islands of Charlevoix County, Michigan